The Hongkong and Yaumati Ferry Company Limited (HYF), is a ferry company founded in 1897 in Hong Kong. It is commonly known as Yaumati Ferry. After restructuring the company in 1989, it became a subsidiary of Hong Kong Ferry (Holdings) Company Limited.

Its head office is in the northern Tsing Yi.

History
The original company was founded by a Chinese business man named Lau Tak Po in 1897 during the Colonial Hong Kong era. At the time he purchased 5 wooden boats and provided services exclusively to Kowloon under the company name "Yaumati Ferry". Yaumati is the alternative transliteration of Yau Ma Tei.

In 1924, Yaumati Ferry obtained the franchise license for the rights to the transportation route, blocking off competition from Star Ferry company. 

The company later became "Hong Kong and Yaumati Ferry". This included the vehicular ferry which served to transport motor vehicles across Victoria Harbour for many years (1933 to 1998) prior to the opening of the Cross-Harbour Tunnel, Eastern Harbour Tunnel and Western Harbour Tunnel in 1972, 1989 and 1997. The company decided to give up the ferry licenses in 1999, and these licenses were transferred to the New World First Ferry on 15 January 2000.

Ownership and control

According to official documents, Henderson Investment Ltd. is the largest shareholder of Hongkong and Yaumati Ferry's parent company Hong Kong Ferry. Henderson beneficially owning 31.33% of the share capital of the Company as at 31 December 2005. Henderson chairman Dr. Lee Shau Kee and Vice Chairman Colin Lam are also Directors of the Company.

End of ferry service
Although it gave up its franchised ferry licences in 2000, the company retained the Dangerous Goods Vehicular Ferry Service routes between North Point, Kwun Tong, and Mui Wo, as these vehicles are not allowed to go through any one of the three cross harbour tunnels, while Mui Wo is situated on Lantau Island.

Fleet

References

External links
  

Transport companies established in 1897
Ferry transport in Hong Kong
Shipping companies of Hong Kong
Henderson Land Development
1897 establishments in Hong Kong
1989 mergers and acquisitions